Lewis Hall Mansion, also known as the Charles H., III, and Sue Beall House, is a historic home located at Wellsburg, Brooke County, West Virginia. It was built in 1850, and is a two-story, rectangular brick dwelling in the Greek Revival style.  It sits on a sandstone ashlar foundation and features a Neoclassical style portico built about 1910.

It was listed on the National Register of Historic Places in 1986.

References

Houses on the National Register of Historic Places in West Virginia
Greek Revival houses in West Virginia
Houses completed in 1850
Houses in Brooke County, West Virginia
National Register of Historic Places in Brooke County, West Virginia